Tyler Vaughns (born June 1, 1997) is an American football wide receiver for the Arlington Renegades of the XFL. He played college football at USC.

Early years
Vaughns attended Bishop Amat High School in La Puente, California. He played wide receiver and defensive back on the football team. He also played basketball in high school. A five star recruit, Vaughns committed to the University of Southern California (USC) to play college football.

College career
After redshirting his first year at USC in 2016, Vaughns played in 14 games and made 10 starts in 2017, recording 57 receptions for 809 yards and five touchdowns. As a redshirt sophomore in 2018, he started 11 of 12 games, finishing the season with 58 receptions for 674 yards and six touchdowns. He returned as a starter his redshirt junior year in 2019.

Professional career

Indianapolis Colts
Vaughns signed with the Indianapolis Colts as an undrafted free agent on May 6, 2021. He was waived on August 31, 2021 and re-signed to the practice squad the next day, but released two days later.

Pittsburgh Steelers
On September 7, 2021, Vaughns was signed to the Pittsburgh Steelers practice squad. He was released on January 14, 2022. He signed a reserve/future contract with the Steelers on January 18, 2022.

On August 30, 2022, Vaughns was waived by the Steelers.

Arlington Renegades
The Arlington Renegades selected Vaughns in the 10th round of the 2023 XFL Supplemental Draft on January 1, 2023.

References

External links
USC Trojans bio

1997 births
Living people
Players of American football from Pasadena, California
American football wide receivers
USC Trojans football players
Indianapolis Colts players
Pittsburgh Steelers players
Arlington Renegades players